Vapours is the third studio album by Montreal-based indie rock band, Islands. It was released on September 22, 2009. Talking to Pitchfork, singer Nick Diamonds stated how he stripped away many of the layers present on the previous Islands album, 2008's Arm's Way. "I needed to withdraw from overblown metaphors and filling every possible sonic space," said Diamonds. "So this record is just made up of sequenced programming, synths, drum machines, guitars, and real bass. And an electric sitar." In this album, Nick "Diamonds" began going by his real name, "Nick Thorburn" and original drummer Jamie Thompson returned to the band.

Track listing

References

2009 albums
Anti- (record label) albums
Islands (band) albums
Albums produced by Chris Coady